Lithodes santolla, also known as the southern king crab, king crab or centolla, is a species of king crab, found off southern South America including the Falklands/Malvinas. On the Pacific side, it is found in Chile from Valdivia at around 40° S to Cape Horn at 60° S. On the Atlantic side, it is found off Argentina.

Physiology 
L. santolla lives in cold-temperature and subantarctic waters. It experiences respiratory acidosis and hyperglycemia after prolonged exposure to air; however, these levels eventually return to normal after reimmersion, making it capable of withstanding long periods of aerial exposure with no detrimental effect on mortality.

Fishing 
The population of Lithodes santolla has seen a dramatic decline due to commercial fishing.

The lucrative centolla fishery around Tierra del Fuego led to an incident in August 1967 when the Argentine schooner  was found fishing  from Gable Island and had to be escorted out of Chilean waters by the Chilean patrol boat . This event among many others led to the Beagle crisis in the late 1970s.

The United States Food and Drug Administration lists the centolla crab and southern king crab as two separate species: Lithodes antarcticus and Lithodes santolla respectively. Other sources consider Lithodes antarcticus to be a synonym of Lithodes santolla.

References

External links

King crabs
Crustaceans of the eastern Pacific Ocean
Western South American coastal fauna
Crustaceans described in 1782
Invertebrates of Argentina
Invertebrates of Chile
Fauna of Tierra del Fuego